Marlinton Chesapeake and Ohio Railroad Station was a historic railway station and bunkhouse located at Marlinton, Pocahontas County, West Virginia. They were built in 1901 by the Chesapeake and Ohio Railroad.  The station was a frame, rectangular, one-story building measuring 76 feet by 16 feet and used for both passengers and freight.  The bunkhouse is a one-story frame building measuring 24 feet by 16 feet.  Both buildings featured vertical board and batten siding and decorative brackets in the wide projecting eaves of their gable roofs.  Passenger service ended at Marlinton in 1958.  Given its location at the trailhead of the Greenbrier River Trail, the station was renovated to house the Pocahontas County Convention and Visitors Bureau. The station was destroyed by fire in 2008; the bunkhouse remains extant.

It was listed on the National Register of Historic Places in 1979.

References

Railway stations on the National Register of Historic Places in West Virginia
Buildings and structures in Pocahontas County, West Virginia
Stations along Chesapeake and Ohio Railway lines
Railway stations in the United States opened in 1901
2008 fires in the United States
National Register of Historic Places in Pocahontas County, West Virginia
Demolished buildings and structures in West Virginia
Former railway stations in West Virginia